Kyaw Lwin is the former Minister of Construction for Myanmar. He was appointed by President Thein Sein in September 2012. He previously served as deputy minister within the Construction Ministry from March 2011 to September 2012.

References

Government ministers of Myanmar
Living people
Year of birth missing (living people)